Julien Dupuy born 19 December 1983 is a former rugby union player for Stade Français in the Top 14. He is now skills and attack coach for RC Toulonnais.

Julien Dupuy played as a Scrum-half.

Julien Dupuy played for Biarritz and Toulouse in the French Top 14 for 7 seasons before joining Leicester Tigers in 2008. At the end of his first season at Leicester he helped them win the 2009 Premiership final, scoring a conversion and a penalty. It was confirmed in April 2009 that he would remain at Leicester for the 2009-10 Guinness Premiership season, but in June 2009, Leicester coach Richard Cockerill
resigned himself to losing Dupuy to Stade Français. He was only halfway through a two-year deal but has reportedly been unsettled at Leicester because his French girlfriend was homesick. After the end of the season, he left Leicester for Stade Français, where his 2009-10 Top 14 season was ended early by a 24-week ban for contact with the eye or eye area of Stephen Ferris during Stade's loss to Ulster in the 2009-10 Heineken Cup. The ban was reduced to 23 weeks on appeal.

France
Dupuy made his France debut on 13 June 2009 in the first Test against New Zealand at Carisbrook, Dunedin, a game that France won by 27 points to 22.

References

External links
Leicester Tigers profile
Scrum.com Profile
ecrrugby Profile

People from Périgueux
1983 births
Living people
Leicester Tigers players
France international rugby union players
Sportspeople from Dordogne
Rugby union scrum-halves